The Théâtre Princesse Grace is a theatre in Monaco.

History
The theatre was dedicated on 17 December 1981 by Princess Grace, who designed the interior decoration. In 2011, the Monegasque royal family celebrated its 30th anniversary. Its current president is her daughter, Princess Stéphanie of Monaco.

References

Theatres in Monaco
Theatres completed in 1981
Grace Kelly